The Engines is the eponymous debut album by the collaborative free jazz quartet consisting of saxophonist Dave Rempis, trombonist Jeb Bishop, bassist Nate McBride and drummer Tim Daisy. It was recorded in 2006 and released on Okka Disk.

Reception
The All About Jazz review by Andrey Henkin states "Is there is a Chicago aesthetic? .. If there is something in common, it is an ability to maintain momentum through a liberal mixture of long and short tones, the blues and squeaky European avant-gardisms, through-composition and lots of tightly executed starts and stops, zigs and zags."

In another review for All About Jazz, Mark Corroto says "Influences from rock to free jazz and small big bands make up this four-way collaboration of very talented musicians. Well worth your listen and admiration."

Track listing
 "Riser" (McBride) – 8:29
 "Jet Lag" (Bishop) – 9:19
 "Careful" (Daisy) – 6:42
 "Mish Mumkin" (Rempis) – 9:56
 "Rewind" (Bishop) – 9:08
 "Backend Cover" (Rempis) – 12:20
 "Four Broken Plates" (Daisy) – 8:37
 "Mash Tun" (McBride) – 8:59

Personnel
Jeb Bishop - trombone
Dave Rempis - alto sax, tenor sax, baritone sax
Nate McBride - bass, electric bass
Tim Daisy - drums

References

2007 albums
Dave Rempis albums